Věra Tichánková (7 December 1920 – 9 January 2014) was a Czech actress, whose career spanned over seven decades.

Věra Tichánková died on 9 January 2014, aged 93, in Prague, Czech Republic. She was survived by her husband, actor and playwright Jan Skopeček.

References

External links

1920 births
2014 deaths
People from the Banská Bystrica Region
Czech people of Slovak descent
Czech film actresses
Czech television actresses
Czech stage actresses
20th-century Czech actresses
21st-century Czech actresses
Czechoslovak actresses
Recipients of the Thalia Award